Golubići may refer to:

 Golubići, Bosnia and Herzegovina, a village near Kalinovik
 Golubići, Croatia, a village near Samobor